Curling at the 2023 Canada Winter Games took place at The Silver Fox Entertainment Complex and the Montague Curling Club in Summerside and Montague, Prince Edward Island. The women's event ran from Sunday, February 19, 2023, to Friday, February 24, 2023. The men's and mixed doubles events ran from Tuesday, February 28, 2023, to Sunday, March 5, 2023.

Medallists

Men

Teams
The teams are listed as follows:

Round robin standings
Final Round Robin Standings

Round robin results
All draw times are listed in Atlantic Time (UTC−04:00).

Draw 1
Tuesday, February 28, 10:00 am

Draw 2
Tuesday, February 28, 2:00 pm

Draw 3
Wednesday, March 1, 10:00 am

Draw 4
Wednesday, March 1, 2:00 pm

Draw 5
Thursday, March 2, 10:00 am

Draw 6
Thursday, March 2, 2:00 pm

Draw 7
Friday, March 3, 10:00 am

Draw 8
Friday, March 3, 2:00 pm

Playoffs

Qualification games
Saturday, March 4, 9:00 am

Semifinals
Saturday, March 4, 2:00 pm

Bronze medal game
Sunday, March 5, 12:00 pm

Final
Sunday, March 5, 12:00 pm

Consolation
For Seeds 7 to 11

Final standings

Women

Teams
The teams are listed as follows:

Round robin standings
Final Round Robin Standings

Round robin results
All draw times are listed in Atlantic Time (UTC−04:00).

Draw 1
Sunday, February 19, 10:00 am

Draw 2
Sunday, February 19, 2:00 pm

Draw 3
Monday, February 20, 10:00 am

Draw 4
Monday, February 20, 2:00 pm

Draw 5
Tuesday, February 21, 2:00 pm

Draw 6
Wednesday, February 22, 10:00 am

Draw 7
Wednesday, February 22, 2:00 pm

Draw 8
Thursday, February 23, 10:00 am

Playoffs

Qualification games
Thursday, February 23, 6:00 pm

Semifinals
Friday, February 24, 10:00 am

Bronze medal game
Friday, February 24, 2:00 pm

Final
Friday, February 24, 2:00 pm

Consolation
For Seeds 7 to 12

Seventh place game
Friday, February 24, 10:00 am

Ninth place game
Thursday, February 23, 6:00 pm

Eleventh place game
Thursday, February 23, 6:00 pm

Final standings

Mixed doubles

Teams
The teams are listed as follows:

Round robin standings
Final Round Robin Standings

Round robin results
All draw times are listed in Atlantic Time (UTC−04:00).

Draw 1
Tuesday, February 28, 10:00 am

Draw 2
Tuesday, February 28, 2:00 pm

Draw 3
Tuesday, February 28, 4:00 pm

Draw 4
Wednesday, March 1, 10:00 am

Draw 5
Wednesday, March 1, 1:00 pm

Draw 6
Wednesday, March 1, 4:00 pm

Draw 7
Thursday, March 2, 10:00 am

Draw 8
Thursday, March 2, 1:00 pm

Draw 9
Thursday, March 2, 4:00 pm

Draw 10
Friday, March 3, 10:00 am

Playoffs

Qualification games
Friday, March 3, 2:00 pm

Semifinals
Saturday, March 4, 2:00 pm

Bronze medal game
Saturday, March 4, 6:00 pm

Final
Saturday, March 4, 6:00 pm

Consolation
For Seeds 7 to 12

Seventh place game
Friday, March 3, 6:00 pm

Ninth place game
Friday, March 3, 6:00 pm

Eleventh place game
Friday, March 3, 6:00 pm

Final standings

References

External links
CG Gems Pro

2023 in Canadian curling
Curling in Prince Edward Island
2023 Canada Winter Games
Montague, Prince Edward Island
Sport in Summerside, Prince Edward Island